Phymatidium is a genus of flowering plants from the orchid family, Orchidaceae. It is native to Brazil, Argentina and Paraguay.

Phymatidium aquinoi Schltr. - Brazil
Phymatidium delicatulum Lindl. - Brazil, Argentina, Paraguay
Phymatidium falcifolium Lindl. - Brazil
Phymatidium geiselii Ruschi - Espírito Santo
Phymatidium glaziovii Toscano - Rio de Janeiro
Phymatidium hysteranthum Barb.Rodr. - Brazil
Phymatidium limae Porto & Brade - Rio de Janeiro
Phymatidium mellobarretoi L.O.Williams & Hoehne - Brazil
Phymatidium microphyllum (Barb.Rodr.) Toscano - Brazil
Phymatidium vogelii Pabst - São Paulo

See also 
 List of Orchidaceae genera

References 

 Berg Pana, H. 2005. Handbuch der Orchideen-Namen. Dictionary of Orchid Names. Dizionario dei nomi delle orchidee. Ulmer, Stuttgart

External links 

Orchids of South America
Oncidiinae genera
Oncidiinae